Lovesick on Nana Street (translit. Hole Ahava B'Shikun Gimel) is a 1995 Israeli comedy drama film directed by Savi Gabizon. It stars Moshe Ivgi, Hana Azulay-Hasfari, Avigail Arieli and Menashe Noy.  Critically acclaimed, it won the Ophir Award for Best Film, and awards internationally at Mannheim and São Paulo. The film was selected as the Israeli entry for the Best Foreign Language Film at the 68th Academy Awards, but was not accepted as a nominee.

See also
 List of submissions to the 68th Academy Awards for Best Foreign Language Film
 List of Israeli submissions for the Academy Award for Best Foreign Language Film

References

External links 
 

1995 films
Israeli comedy-drama films
1995 comedy-drama films
1990s Hebrew-language films